Robert Drummond or Bob Drummond may refer to:

Robert Drummond (businessman) (1791–1834), early Canadian businessman
Robert Hay Drummond (1711–1776), Archbishop of York
Robert James Drummond (1858–1951), moderator of the United Free Church of Scotland in 1918
Robert Drummond (gridiron football) (born 1967), former gridiron football running back
Robert Drummond of Carnock (died 1592), Master of Work to the Crown of Scotland
Rob Drummond (born 1986), Canadian ice hockey player
Bob Drummond (footballer, born 1898) (1898–?), Scottish association footballer 
Bob Drummond (Australian footballer) (1919–1991), Australian rules footballer